Acontia cretata, the chalky bird dropping moth, is a moth of the family Noctuidae. The species was first described by Augustus Radcliffe Grote and Coleman Townsend Robinson in 1870. It is found from the US states of California to Texas and Oklahoma, north to Colorado and Utah.

The wingspan is 22–27 mm. Adults are on wing from April to September.

The larva has been recorded as a host of the parasitoid braconid wasp Bracon mellitor.

References

cretata
Moths of North America
Moths described in 1870